Wheelchair Rugby at the 2004 Summer Paralympics was staged at the Helliniko Indoor Arena from September 19 to September 25.

Teams from eight countries participated in the competition, with a total of 89 athletes taking part. While wheelchair rugby was designated a mixed sport, with both men and women eligible to participate in the competition, no female athletes took part.

New Zealand's victory in the gold medal game represented the first time that a country from outside North America had won a Paralympics or World Championships title in the sport.

The wheelchair rugby competition in Athens was featured in the 2005 documentary film Murderball.

Medalists

Classification
Wheelchair rugby players were given a classification based on their upper body function. A committee gave each athlete a 7-level score ranging from 0.5 to 3.5, with lower scores corresponding to more severe disability. During the game, the total score of all players on the court for a team cannot exceed 8 points. However, for each female player on court, their team gets an extra 0.5 points over the 8 point limit.

Teams

Eight teams took part in this sport. Each team could have up to 12 athletes, but no more than 11 of the team members could be male. Listed below are the eight teams qualified for the Athens Paralympics.

Tournament

Competition format 
The eight teams were divided into two even groups and participated in a single round robin tournament. The top two teams from each group went on to compete for 1st through 4th place, while the last two teams from each group competed for 5th through 8th place.

Preliminary Round 

 Qualified for quarterfinals

Source: Paralympic.org

Medal round 

Source: Paralympic.org

Classification 5-8 

Source: Paralympic.org

Ranking

External links
 Wheelchair rugby results from the United States Quad Rugby Association
 International Wheelchair Rugby Federation

References 

2004 Summer Paralympics events
2004